The Davey O'Brien Award, officially the Davey O'Brien National Quarterback Award, named after Davey O'Brien, is presented annually to the collegiate American football player judged by the Davey O'Brien Foundation to be the best of all National Collegiate Athletic Association quarterbacks.  The Davey O'Brien Hall of Fame is housed at The Fort Worth Club in Fort Worth, Texas. The annual awards dinner and trophy presentation is held there as well, usually in February.

In 1977, directly after the death of O'Brien, the award was established as the Davey O'Brien Memorial Trophy, and was given to the most outstanding player in the Southwest. Texas running back Earl Campbell  won the trophy in 1977, Oklahoma running back Billy Sims won it in 1978, and Baylor linebacker Mike Singletary won it twice in 1979 and 1980. In 1981, the award was renamed the Davey O'Brien Award. Since then, only four players have won the award more than once: Ty Detmer of BYU, Danny Wuerffel of Florida, Jason White of Oklahoma, and Deshaun Watson of Clemson.

Winners

Davey O'Brien Memorial Trophy

Davey O'Brien Award

References

External links
Official website

College football national player awards
Awards established in 1981